This is a list of electoral results for the Silvan Province in Victorian state elections.

Members for Silvan Province

Election results

Elections in the 2000s

Elections in the 1990s

References

Victoria (Australia) state electoral results by district